Anne Jung (born 21 August 1981) is a German rhythmic gymnast. She competed in the women's group all-around event at the 1996 Summer Olympics.

References

External links
 

1981 births
Living people
German rhythmic gymnasts
Olympic gymnasts of Germany
Gymnasts at the 1996 Summer Olympics
People from Groß-Umstadt
Sportspeople from Darmstadt (region)
20th-century German women
21st-century German women